The 1905–06 SEGAS Championship was the first organised Hellenic Amateur Athletic Association competition to take place in mainland Greece. It took place in March 1906. It was not organised by the HFF and as such it is not recognised by it.

Season summary
All 3 matches took place at the Neo Phaliron Velodrome between March and April 1906. Ethnikos Athens won the championship after beating the other two teams with a 3-0 score.

Teams
All 3 teams were either from Athens or Piraeus, despite it being called a Panhellenic Championship, which would imply the competition was nationwide.

References
RSSSF

 

Panhellenic Championship seasons
Greece
1905–06 in Greek football